Iman Budi Hernandi (born 13 July 1993) is an Indonesian professional footballer who plays as a midfielder for Liga 1 club Arema.

Club career

Early career
Iman Budi made his football career with Arema U21. And In early 2014, he was loaned to Perseba Bangkalan and brought this team to the Second Division after champion in the Third Division.

Laga FC
He took part in Laga FC which will compete in 2015 Liga Indonesia Premier Division.

Persela Lamongan
He joined Persela Lamongan for 2015 Indonesia President's Cup and 2016 Indonesia Soccer Championship A.

Persik kediri
He was signed for Persik Kediri to play in Liga 2 in the 2017 season. He made 11 league appearances and scored 1 goal for Persik Kediri.

Madura FC
In 2018, Iman Budi signed a one-year contract with Indonesian Liga 2 club Madura. He made 25 league appearances and scored 3 goals for Madura FC.

Persis Solo
He was signed for Persis Solo to play in Liga 2 in the 2019 season. Iman made 19 league appearances and scored 4 goals for Persis Solo.

Persela Lamongan
He was signed for Persela Lamongan to play in Liga 1 in the 2021 season. Iman made his league debut on 10 September 2021 in a match against Persipura Jayapura at the Wibawa Mukti Stadium, Cikarang.

PSMS Medan
In 2021, Iman signed a contract with Indonesian Liga 2 club PSMS Medan. He made his league debut on 4 November 2021 in a match against KS Tiga Naga. Iman scored his first goal for PSMS in the 5th minute at the Kaharudin Nasution Rumbai Stadium, Pekanbaru.

Return to Arema
On 29 January 2023, Hernandi signed a contract with Liga 1 club Arema from PSMS Medan. Hernandi made his league debut for the club in a 1–2 win against RANS Nusantara, coming on as a substituted Gian Zola.

References

External links
 
 Iman Budi Hernandi at Liga Indonesia

Indonesian footballers
1993 births
Living people
Sportspeople from Malang
Arema F.C. players
Persela Lamongan players
Persik Kediri players
Indonesian Premier League players
Liga 2 (Indonesia) players
Association football midfielders